Pseudaprophata puncticornis is a species of beetle in the family Cerambycidae. It was described by Heller in 1924. It is known from the Philippines.

Subspecies
 Pseudaprophata puncticornis negrosiana Hüdepohl, 1987
 Pseudaprophata puncticornis puncticornis (Heller, 1924)
 Pseudaprophata puncticornis romblonica Hüdepohl, 1987

References

Pteropliini
Beetles described in 1924